The Volkswagen D24 engine is a 2.4-litre inline-six-cylinder (R6/I6), naturally aspirated diesel engine, formerly manufactured by Volkswagen Group from 1978 to 1995.

Subsequent forced induction variants of this engine were also available as the Volkswagen D24T engine with a turbocharger, and a turbo intercooled version, the Volkswagen D24TIC engine.  These turbocharged variants resulted in higher power and torque outputs.

Technical description
Its inline six cylinder block is constructed from grey cast iron, and has seven main bearings to support the die-forged steel crankshaft. The cast aluminium alloy cylinder head contains two valves per cylinder each with two concentric valve springs, and shim-adjustable bucket tappets. The valves are opened via a timing belt-driven single overhead camshaft (SOHC), and the combustion chamber compression ratio is 23.0:1.

Attached to the cylinder head is a cast aluminium alloy intake manifold on one side, and two cast iron exhaust manifolds on the same side (it's a non cross flow engine) (one manifold for three cylinders) followed by a two in one exhaust pipe system.  The fuel system uses a Bosch mechanical distributor-type (Bosch VE type) injection pump which feeds indirect fuel injection into a remote whirl pre-combustion chamber.

The cooling system is composed of a timing belt driven water pump, an 87 °C thermostat in the engine block itself. The thermostat receives coolant from the engine block and from a bypass running from the engine head. This system allows a very accurate opening and closing operation, avoiding thermal shocks and big coolant temperatures amplitude.

Subsequent minor updates and revisions resulted in differing power and torque ratings.

The weight of this engine is 182 kg or 401 lbs.

Applications
The D24 was fitted in the Volkswagen LT range from Volkswagen Commercial Vehicles, with factory production from August 1978 to December 1995.  Specific dates of the variants - CP: 08/78-11/82, DW: 12/82-07/92, 1S: 08/88-07/92, ACT: 08/92-12/95.

The D24 was also found in a number of Volvo Cars - specifically the 240, 740, and 940 and was coupled to Volvo ZF, Automatic Aisin Warner AW55, Automatic Borg Warner BW55, M45, M46 (overdrive) or M47, M47 II and M90 transmissions.

The D24 also found use in military vehicle applications. It was used in the Steyr-Daimler-Puch Pinzgauer High Mobility All-Terrain Vehicle 716 & 718 models in its turbocharged variant - the D24T.

Operational experience

In service, the unit proved to be a somewhat mixed bag; some owners reported excellent reliability and long engine lives, others complained of overheating, frequent blowing of head gaskets, cylinder head cracks (cracks between the valve seats are common and do not represent danger if the cracks do not exceed specifications), premature wear of the bottom and top end bearings, low oil pressure etc.

A poorly maintained cooling system could also lead to overheating and, especially with the higher stressed turbo engines, head gasket problems.
The head gasket problem has been treated with the adoption of a multi-layer steel head gasket which replaces the fiber one.

The camshaft drive belt also required changing at the recommended intervals, which was a pretty involved job, not least because of poor access in the under-floor engined LT vans, and the necessity of special (and expensive) locking tools to carry out the replacement, which have always been scarce and are becoming increasingly difficult to obtain.

The top end also featured adjustable tappets using the bucket and shim arrangement, and required checking every , although later (1990–) models had self-adjusting hydraulic tappets.

In many cases however, engines that have been looked after properly and treated with mechanical sympathy, have been known to clock up 500,000 - 600,000 miles. This engine is particularly sensitive to being thrashed from cold, it is important to go gently until warmed up, and to avoid short journeys which will exacerbate rapid engine wear.

See also
List of Volkswagen Group diesel engines
List of discontinued Volkswagen Group diesel engines
Wasserboxer
List of Volvo engines

References

 http://www.volvoclub.org.uk/press/pdf/240DieselPressRelease1978.pdf

External links
Volkswagen Group corporate website
Chemnitz (Germany) - engine plant Mobility and Sustainability
Kassel (Germany) - engine plant Mobility and Sustainability
Salzgitter (Germany) - engine plant Mobility and Sustainability
Polkowice (Poland) - engine plant Mobility and Sustainability
São Carlos (Brazil) - engine plant Mobility and Sustainability
Shanghai (China) - engine plant Mobility and Sustainability
 http://www.volvoclub.org.uk/press/pdf/240DieselPressRelease1978.pdf

D24
D24
Diesel engines by model
Straight-six engines